Dimitris Papadopoulos (born August 15, 1966, in Greece), also commonly known by his nickname, "The Doctor", is a former Greek professional basketball player.

Professional career
Papadopoulos began his pro club career with the Greek club Iraklis Thessaloniki. Papadopoulos and Lefteris Kakiousis were the key players of the team in those days. With Iraklis, he was a Greek Cup finalist in 1994. Papadopoulos is the second leading scorer, the first rebounder, the first in three-point field goals made, and the third player in the number of games played, in Iraklis' club history.

Papadopoulos finished his playing career with the Greek club AEK Athens.

National team career
Papadopoulos was also a member of the senior men's Greek national team. He played at the 1988 FIBA European Olympic Qualifying Tournament. With Greece, he won the silver medal at the 1989 EuroBasket. 

Papadopoulos was also a member of the Greek national teams that finished in sixth place at the 1990 FIBA World Championship, and in fifth place at the 1991 EuroBasket. He also represented Greece at the 1992 FIBA European Olympic Qualifying Tournament.

Personal life
After, his retirement from playing professional club basketball, Papadopoulos became an Anesthesiologist.

References

External links 
FIBA Archive Profile
FIBA Europe Profile
Eurobasket.com Profile
ProBallers.com Profile
Hellenic Federation Profile 

1966 births
Living people
1990 FIBA World Championship players
AEK B.C. players
Basketball players from Thessaloniki
Greek Basket League players
Greek men's basketball players
Iraklis Thessaloniki B.C. players
Small forwards
Power forwards (basketball)